A candlestick is a decorative holder for one or more candles.

Candlestick may also refer to:

 Candlestick chart, a type of chart showing price movements of an item (e.g. equities) over a period of time
 Candlestick Park, a stadium in San Francisco
 Candlestick telephone, a style of telephone common in the early 20th century
 Candlestick (film), a thriller released in 2015
 Seven-Branch Candlestick, the Jewish Temple menorah

See also
 Candle holder (disambiguation)
 Triple candlestick (disambiguation)